Turku School of Economics (Finnish Turun kauppakorkeakoulu) is a unit of the University of Turku located in Turku, Finland. It was established as an independent higher education business school in 1950, until it was acquired by the state in 1977. It was the second largest school of its kind in Finland, with approximately 2,000 graduate and 250 postgraduate students and a staff of 350. In January 2010, Turku School of Economics became the seventh faculty of the University of Turku. Its former rector, Professor Tapio Reponen, is now a vice rector of the University of Turku.

In addition to teaching a wide variety of economic and business related subjects, the faculty conducts research on matters relating to its field, and offers consulting services to businesses. Teaching is mainly carried out in Finnish, but there are also a number of courses available in English.

As a higher education institution, Turku School of Economics had been one of the most efficient universities in terms of master's per professor.

Organisation of Turku School of Economics
Main departments
Department of Management
Management and Organization
Information Systems Science
Entrepreneurship
Department of Accounting and Finance
Accounting and Finance
Business Law
Quantitative Methods in Economics
Department of Marketing and International Business
Marketing
International Business
Economic Geography
Economic Sociology
Supply Chain Management
Department of Economics
Economics
Auxiliary units
Business Research and Development Centre
Small Business Institute
Pan-European Institute
Innomarket
Institute for Executive Education
Media Group
Institute for Competition Policy Studies
Centre for Responsible Business
Finland Futures Research centre
Pori Unit
Turku Centre for Computer Science (TUCS)

At the Turku School of Economics, you can study two international master's degree programmes in English
 Global Innovation Management
 Futures Studies

External links
Turku School of Economics

References

Education in Turku
Business schools in Finland
Educational institutions established in 1950
University of Turku
1950 establishments in Finland